The 2003 Currie Cup was the 2003 season of the South African domestic rugby union competition, the Absa Currie Cup premier division, played from 26 July 2003 - 1 November 2003. The 2003 Currie Cup saw the implementation of a new format for the tournament with the Cup being split into two divisions, the Premier Division and a lower division. The Premier Division consisting of the top six provincial teams and the lower division consisting of eight teams for a total of 14 teams participating in the Currie Cup. The teams in the divisions played matches among themselves with top teams progressing to the finals. The finals were played at Loftus Versfeld Stadium where the Blue Bulls beat the  40–19 to win the cup. This was the second in a streak of three consecutive Currie Cup wins for the Blue Bulls between 2002 and 2004. The Blue Bulls' Ettienne Botha scored two tries in the final. This equalled the record for tries scored in a Currie Cup final at the time.

Team standings

Fixtures

Round 1

Source of matches

Round 2

Round 3

Round 4

Round 5

Round 6

Round 7

Round 8

Round 9

Round 10

Round 11

Round 12

Round 13

Round 14

Grand Final

References

 
2003 in South African rugby union
2003 rugby union tournaments for clubs